Rutin, also called rutoside, quercetin-3-O-rutinoside and sophorin, is the glycoside combining the flavonol quercetin and the disaccharide rutinose (α-L-rhamnopyranosyl-(1→6)-β-D-glucopyranose). It is a flavonoid found in a wide variety of plants, including citrus.

Occurrences 
Rutin is one of the phenolic compounds found in the invasive plant species, Carpobrotus edulis. Its name comes from the name of Ruta graveolens, a plant that also contains rutin. Various citrus fruit peels contain 32 to 49 mg/g of flavonoids expressed as rutin equivalents. Citrus leaves contain rutin at concentrations of 11 and 7 g/kg in orange and lime trees, respectively. In 2021, Samoan researchers identified rutin in the native plant, matalafi (Psychotria insularum).

Metabolism 
The enzyme quercitrinase found in Aspergillus flavus is in the rutin catabolic pathway.

In food 
Rutin is a citrus flavonoid glycoside found in many plants, including buckwheat, the leaves and petioles of Rheum species, and asparagus.  Tartary buckwheat seeds have been found to contain more rutin (about 0.8–1.7% dry weight) than common buckwheat seeds (0.01% dry weight). Rutin is one of the primary flavonols found in 'clingstone' peaches. It is also found in green tea infusions.

Approximate rutin content per 100g of selected foods, in milligrams per 100 milliliters:

Research
Rutin (rutoside or rutinoside) and other dietary flavonols are under preliminary clinical research for their potential biological effects, such as in reducing post-thrombotic syndrome, venous insufficiency, or endothelial dysfunction, but there was no high-quality evidence for their safe and effective uses as of 2018. A 2020 review indicated that oral rutosides may reduce leg edema in people with post-thrombotic syndrome, but the risk of adverse effects was higher.

As a flavonol among similar flavonoids, rutin has low bioavailability due to poor absorption, high metabolism, and rapid excretion that collectively make its potential for use as a therapeutic agent limited.

Biosynthesis 
The biosynthesis pathway of rutin in mulberry (Morus alba L.) leaves begins with phenylalanine, which produces cinnamic acid under the action of phenylalanine ammonia lyase (PAL). Cinnamic acid is catalyzed by cinnamic acid-4-hydroxylase (C4H) and 4-coumarate-CoA ligase (4CL) to form p-coumaroyl-CoA. Subsequently, chalcone synthase (CHS) catalyzes the condensation of p-coumaroyl-CoA and three molecules of malonyl-CoA to produce naringenin chalcone, which is eventually converted into naringenin flavanone with the participation of chalcone isomerase (CHI). With the action of flavanone 3-hydroxylas (F3H), dihydrokaempferol (DHK) is generated. DHK can be further hydroxylated by flavonoid 3´-hydroxylase (F3'H) to produce dihydroquercetin (DHQ), which is then catalyzed by flavonol synthase (FLS) to form quercetin. After quercetin is catalyzed by UDP-glucose flavonoid 3-O-glucosyltransferase (UFGT) to form isoquercitrin, finally, the formation of rutin from isoquercitrin is catalyzed by flavonoid 3-O-glucoside L-rhamnosyltransferase.

References

External links 

CYP3A4 inhibitors
Quercetin glycosides
Flavonol rutinosides
Flavonoid antioxidants
Polyphenols